Tateiwa Dam is a dam in the Hiroshima Prefecture of Japan.

Dams in Hiroshima Prefecture
Dams completed in 1939
Ōta River